Ecbolium viride is a species of Ecbolium of the family Acanthaceae. It can be found in Bangladesh, India and Sri Lanka, where it is widely used as a medicinal plant.

Chemical present
Leaves, roots and flowers contain orientin, vitexin, isoorientin, isovitexin.

References

Acanthaceae